Shurayi (also Romanized as Shūrāyī; also known as Shūrānī) is a village in Rahdar Rural District, in the Central District of Rudan County, Hormozgan Province, Iran. At the 2006 census, its population was 138, in 33 families.

References 

Populated places in Rudan County